Warao may refer to:
 Warao people
 Warao language

Language and nationality disambiguation pages